Greg Rusedski was the defending champion, but did not participate this year.

First-seeded Jim Courier won the title, beating Magnus Gustafsson 7–6(12–10), 3–6, 6–3 in the final.

Seeds

Draw

Finals

Top half

Bottom half

References

 Main Draw

1997 ATP Tour